Milton is an electoral ward of Southend-on-Sea covering the seafront area west of Southend town centre. It is represented by three local government councillors, each elected to serve a four-year term.

Boundaries
The wards boundaries are the seafront in the south, the Queensway ring road in the east and London road in the north.

Ward Profile
The ward is defined by the seafront and urban areas it covers, the area covers parts of Westcliff and southend town centre. While covering a large part of the less active part of Southend Seafront.

Councillors
These are the councillors elected for Milton ward.

 Indicates Councillor elected that year.
 Indicates Councillor defected to the Conservatives.

Elections

Elections in the 2010s

Green party candidate compared to 2018 election. No For Britain (-5.3) as previous.

References

Electoral wards of Southend-on-Sea